The Toyota Venza is a five-passenger mid-size crossover SUV manufactured and marketed by Toyota primarily for the North American market. The first-generation model was based on the XV40 series Camry platform and sold between 2008 and 2017. It also shared the platform with the AL10 series Lexus RX. The second-generation model is a rebadged Japanese-market XU80 series Harrier and has been sold since September 2020.

The name "Venza" is a mix of "Venture" and "Monza."



First generation (AV10; 2008) 

The first-generation Venza was unveiled at the 2008 North American International Auto Show in Detroit. It was designed at the Calty Design studios in Newport Beach, California, based on the FT-SX concept car and primarily engineered at Toyota Technical Center in Ann Arbor, Michigan. Venza's production began at Toyota Motor Manufacturing Kentucky (TMMK) in Georgetown, Kentucky in November 2008. The 2.7 L model was launched in February 2009.

The first-generation Venza is based on the XV40 series Camry chassis (K platform) and is similar to the Mark X ZiO in concept. It was powered by either a 2.7 L 1AR-FE four-cylinder engine or a 3.5 L 2GR-FE V6 engine, both mated to a 6-speed automatic transmission. Front-wheel drive and all-wheel drive were available as options.

Features 
The Venza had a single trim level, with numerous packages and options. Standard features include fog lamps, 19-inch alloy wheels (2.7 L), 20-inch alloy wheels (3.5 L), HomeLink, XM satellite radio, 6-disc CD changer, dual-zone climate control, electrochromic auto-dimming rear-view mirror, 8-way power drivers seat, steering-wheel mounted audio controls, Hill-Start assist control and the Toyota Star Safety System.

Options include automatic high beams with HID lighting, heated side view mirrors, power liftgate, leather seat surfaces, 4-way power passenger seat, panoramic glass moonroof, smart key system, 13-speaker JBL sound system with Bluetooth, voice-activated touch-screen DVD navigation system, backup camera and a rear DVD entertainment system with a 9-inch display and two wireless headphones. The Touring Package, which included HID headlights, push button start, Navigation and JBL Package were only available on the 3.5-liter all-wheel drive configuration. The Premium Package contained the moonroof and backup camera was available on all but the 2.7-liter front-wheel drive configuration, while the leather package was available on all models.

For 2010, the Venza received a standard USB audio input and Bluetooth hands-free phone capability. Due to this addition, a single-CD player unit replaced the previously standard in-dash 6-disc CD changer.

For 2012, the Venza featured LE, XLE and Limited trim levels for the US market, replacing the single-grade line with various option packages. The LE and XLE trims were available with all powertrain combinations: 2.7-liter, 3.5-liter, front-wheel drive or all-wheel drive; the Venza Limited comes with the 3.5-liter engine only, in front-wheel drive or all-wheel drive configurations. Canadian models retained the single trim level, adding only a Convenience Package for the 2.7-liter all-wheel drive trim.

2012 facelift 

In 2012, for the 2013 model year, the Venza received a mid-cycle facelift. It was revealed at the New York International Auto Show in April 2012 and went on sale during May 2012. 2.7 L models receive restyled 19-inch alloy wheels. The 2013 model also added Toyota's Entune System.

Engines

Safety 
The Venza was equipped with vehicle stability control, traction control system, electronic brakeforce distribution, emergency brake assist, anti-lock braking system, smart stop technology as well as hill-start assist control, tire-pressure monitoring system, active head restraints for front-seat occupants, 3-point seat belts and headrests for all seats, emergency locking retractors (ELR) for all seats, automatic locking retractors (ATR) for all seats (except driver's), front seatbelt pretensioners with force limiters. LATCH (Lower Anchors and Tethers for Children) for rear outboard seats and seven standard airbags, including dual-stage front airbags, driver's knee airbag, front seat-mounted side airbags, 2-row side curtain airbags and fuel pump cut-off switch with airbag deployment. The rear bumper system was awarded Toyota's top honor for innovation, and safety.

Some Venza owners have reported a safety concern because the sun visor can suddenly sag and obscure the driver's vision while driving. The visor must be replaced once this occurs. An online petition was created to encourage Toyota to issue a safety recall due to the failing sun visors.

Crash testing 

The Insurance Institute for Highway Safety gave the Venza its Top Safety Pick rating in 2009.  The Venza is also rated "Good" in the roof strength test, as a result the Venza also received the Insurance Institute for Highway Safety Top Safety Pick in 2010 and 2011 when roof strength became a criterion for receiving the award.

Production 
The first-generation Venza began production at Toyota Motor Manufacturing Kentucky (TMMK) on November 11, 2008, with over 70 percent of the Venza's components coming from US suppliers. Toyota projected sales of between 75,000 and 100,000 units of Venza per year. The first-generation Venza was one of the two North American built Toyota automobiles (alongside the Avalon) not to be sold in Mexico.

TMMK stopped production of the Venza in the American market in June 2015. Production of the vehicle remained there for export until 2017.

Marketing 
During the 2008 vehicle launch, Toyota marketed Venza under the campaign "You're More than One Thing. So is Venza".

In Canada, the Venza was featured as a prize in the 2009 Tim Hortons "Rrroll up the rim to win" promotion.

In 2013, the Venza debuted in Russian and Chinese markets.

Classification 
Determining whether the Venza is a crossover SUV or wagon isn't clear; some journalists regard it as the "Camry station wagon" (the successor to the 1991-1996 Camry wagon which was the last iteration to offer this style in Canada and the US) while other sources often describe it simply as new type of "crossover". Toyota states the Venza blends the "styling and comfort of a passenger car with the flexibility of a sport utility vehicle". According to Toyota, Venza is neither a station wagon nor SUV, rather it is targeted at customers who want more room and flexibility than the Camry sedan but desire a smaller size than the Highlander, a three-row mid-size crossover SUV. Toyota lists the Venza's competitors as the Honda Accord and Nissan Altima on their website's comparison page, both being popular mid-size sedans. Meanwhile, the United States Environmental Protection Agency (EPA) classified the Venza as a sport utility vehicle.

Toyota told automotive magazine Motor Trend that it forwent entering the Venza in the publication's SUV of the Year competition. Toyota requested that the Venza compete in the Car of the Year competition. Motor Trend decided that the Venza should not compete in any competition at all since its ride height is too high to be qualified as a car.

Discontinuation 
In 2015, Toyota announced that the first-generation Venza would be discontinued after the 2015 model year. According to Toyota, there are three factors that contributed to this decision: customer preference, competitiveness within the segment and deteriorating sales. Production of US models ended in June 2015 and export models ended production in 2017.

Second generation (XU80; 2020) 

The second-generation Venza is a rebadged Japanese-market XU80 series Harrier, released for the North American market for the 2021 model year. It was initially planned to be revealed at the April 2020 New York International Auto Show but it was instead unveiled online in North America on May 18, 2020. Unlike the Harrier, the Venza for this market is only available with a all-wheel drive hybrid powertrain. While the first-generation model was produced in the US, the North American second-generation model is produced in Japan.

The second-generation Venza is also sold in China by GAC Toyota and produced at the Guangzhou factory, with alterations on the front fascia.

U.S. early changes 
 2021, for the 2022 model year: The Limited grade was updated, with fog lights for poor weather conditions.

 2022, for the 2023 model year: The Nightshade package is added for the XLE model, the exterior colour Wind Chill Pearl (replaced the Blizzard Pearl), the Limited grade gets a 12.3" full digital instrument cluster, and features four drive modes.

Sales

References

External links 

 

Venza
Cars introduced in 2008
2010s cars
2020s cars
Mid-size sport utility vehicles
Crossover sport utility vehicles
Front-wheel-drive vehicles
All-wheel-drive vehicles
Hybrid sport utility vehicles
Partial zero-emissions vehicles
Vehicles with CVT transmission
Motor vehicles manufactured in the United States